Tyler Starr (born January 25, 1991) is a former American football linebacker. He was drafted by the Atlanta Falcons in the seventh round (255th overall) of the 2014 NFL Draft. He played college football at South Dakota.

College career
Starr played college football for two years at the University of South Dakota.

Professional career

On August 30, 2014, Starr made the 53 man roster for the Atlanta Falcons, but did not see any game action. On September 5, 2015, Starr was waived by the Falcons in the final cuts before the start of the regular season. On September 7, 2015, he was signed to the Falcons' practice squad. On December 18. 2015, Starr was promoted to the Falcons' 53-man roster. He played in one game for the Falcons in 2015.

On September 3, 2016, Starr was waived/injured by the Falcons and placed on injured reserve.

Starr participated in The Spring League in 2017.

References

External links
South Dakota Coyotes bio

1991 births
Living people
American football linebackers
Atlanta Falcons players
People from Lyon County, Iowa
Players of American football from Iowa
South Dakota Coyotes football players
The Spring League players